Metachanda oxyacma is a moth species in the oecophorine tribe Metachandini. It was described by Edward Meyrick in 1926. Its type locality is in South Africa.

References

Endemic moths of South Africa
Oecophorinae
Moths described in 1926
Taxa named by Edward Meyrick
Moths of Africa